David Kavelasvili (born 2 August 1985) is a Georgian-born Greek weightlifter. He competed for Greece at the 2012 Summer Olympics.

References

Greek male weightlifters
Weightlifters at the 2012 Summer Olympics
Olympic weightlifters of Greece
1985 births
Living people
Georgian emigrants to Greece
Naturalized citizens of Greece
Mediterranean Games gold medalists for Greece
Mediterranean Games medalists in weightlifting
Competitors at the 2013 Mediterranean Games
Male weightlifters from Georgia (country)